The 1935 New York Yankees season was the team's 33rd season. The team finished with a record of 89–60, finishing 3 games behind the Detroit Tigers. New York was managed by Joe McCarthy. The Yankees played at Yankee Stadium.

Offseason 
 February 26, 1935: Babe Ruth was released by the Yankees.

Regular season 
Once again, the Yankees finished second best in the American League, although they came within three games of the eventual world champions Detroit Tigers. This team was just a year away from starting a 4-year dominance of baseball greatness.

Although Lefty Gomez (12–15) fell off dramatically from his form from the previous four seasons, the Yanks still had the best pitching in the league. The New York staff led the AL in both ERA (3.60) and strikeouts (594). Red Ruffing was the top Yankee winner (16–11) for the first time in five years, followed by Johnny Broaca (15–7), a solid 25-year-old pitcher Johnny Allen (13–6), Johnny Murphy (10–5) and Vito Tamulis (10–5) were also consistent winners.

Before the season, the Yanks released legend Babe Ruth. Ruth, who never cared for Joe McCarthy, had asked Yankee owner Jake Ruppert, if he, Ruth, could manage the team. Ruppert steadfastly refused, and Ruth then asked to be set free. The Yanks worked out a deal with the Boston Braves in which Ruth would join the Braves in many capacities. So when Babe left the Yankees, it was more or less on amicable terms. His departure rendered the club, now Ruthless for the first time since 1919, short on color; home attendance sank to a partly 657,508. second lowest ever in Yankee Stadium.

Lou Gehrig (30 HRs, 119 RBIs, .329) was the only legitimate Yankees power hitter. He led the league in runs scored (125) and walks (132). That was the highest walk total of Gehrig's career-pitchers tended to work around Lou. Earle Combs known as both "The Kentucky Colonel" and "The Mail Carrier" wrapped up his great career. George Selkirk (11 HRs, 94 RBIs, .312) played Ruth's old right field position and performed splendidly. Another youngster Red Rolfe, became the third baseman and hit .300. This Yankee edition still had power, setting a major-league record for the most solo home runs in a single game – six. This was in a June 1 game with the Boston Red Sox (Dickey hit two, Frank Crosetti hit one, Ben Chapman hit one, Selkirk hit one and Rolfe hit one).

This young Yankee club showed real promise. But the team appeared to very much need another slugger to aid Gehrig and also to relieve some of the emotional emptiness that the team and the city of New York felt in Ruth's absence.

Season standings

Record vs. opponents

Roster

Player stats

Batting

Starters by position 
Note: Pos = Position; G = Games played; AB = At bats; H = Hits; Avg. = Batting average; HR = Home runs; RBI = Runs batted in

Other batters 
Note: G = Games played; AB = At bats; H = Hits; Avg. = Batting average; HR = Home runs; RBI = Runs batted in

Pitching

Starting pitchers 
Note: G = Games pitched; IP = Innings pitched; W = Wins; L = Losses; ERA = Earned run average; SO = Strikeouts

Other pitchers 
Note: G = Games pitched; IP = Innings pitched; W = Wins; L = Losses; ERA = Earned run average; SO = Strikeouts

Relief pitchers 
Note: G = Games pitched; W = Wins; L = Losses; SV = Saves; ERA = Earned run average; SO = Strikeouts

Farm system 

LEAGUE CHAMPIONS: Binghamton

Notes

References 
1935 New York Yankees at Baseball Reference
1935 New York Yankees team page at www.baseball-almanac.com

New York Yankees seasons
New York Yankees
New York Yankees
1930s in the Bronx